Erythrocrine describes red blood cell or erythrocyte for production and release of signaling molecules. The term “erythrocrine“ was coined by Song et al.[1] in reference to erythrocyte, particularly the mature erythrocyte as a secretory cell, not just engaging in gaseous conveyance and exchange.

The erythrocyte is differentiated for such function to predominantly express hemoglobin and remove all the organelle including protein synthesis machinery. Our traditional review of erythrocyte function is solely for gaseous exchange. Nevertheless, several previously undetected physiologic functions of erythrocyte are largely neglected.

References

1.  Song CZ, Wang QW, Song CC (January 2013). "Erythrocyte-based analgesic peptides". Regulatory Peptides 180 (10): 58–61. doi: 10.1016/j.regpep.2012.11.003. .

Blood cells